On 15 February 2022, a six-year-old boy named Haider fell into a 25-metre narrow well while walking on the side of the road in Shokak village, Zabul, Afghanistan. His body was recovered on 18 February 2022.

Rescue 
When Haider fell into the well, rescuers pulled him up ten metres, but he became stuck in a place where the well-casing was very narrow. He remained in that position for about 30 hours.

Rescue officials retrieved Haider on 18 February after hours of trying. He had not been heard for 24 hours. Rescuers dug a trench to reach the Haider, who was airlifted to a hospital in Kabul.

When the incident was reported, Afghan Defence Minister Mohammad Yaqoob and senior Taliban leader Anas Haqqani arrived at the scene and oversaw the rescue operation.

Reactions
Anas Haqqani, a senior adviser to the Taliban's Interior Ministry, said in a tweet "With great sadness, little Haider is gone forever".

See also
 Death of Yahya
 Death of Rayan Aourram

References

2022 in Afghanistan
Zabul Province
Haider
2022 deaths
Haider
Haider
Child deaths
February 2022 events in Asia